Albert Willimsky (29 December 1890 – 22 February 1940) was a German Roman Catholic priest active in resistance movement against the National Socialism, martyred in the Sachsenhausen concentration camp.

Biography 
Willimsky was born on 29 December 1890 in Oberglogau (now Głogówek) in Prussian Silesia. After he finished secondary school, he started his theological studies at the Breslau University. During the World War I, he decided to suspend his studies to work as a medic and later, as a radio-telegraphist.

In 1933, while he was a provost in Friesack (Havelland district), he openly criticized Nazism, and because of that he fell into conflict with local authorities. In  he had to leave this parish and became a provost in Gransee. In , he was arrested for the first time by the Gestapo. Here he encountered maltreatment of Polish forced labourers working in extremely difficult conditions. He died several weeks later.

Memory 
 Parc named Park im. Alberta Willimskyego in Szczecin-Podjuchy, where he worked in years 1939-1940,
 Commemorative plaque in a crypt of St. Hedwig's Cathedral,
 Commemorative plaque in Gransee, also in memory priest Paul Bartsch.

Bibliography 
 Bogdan Frankiewicz, Ksiądz Albert Willimsky - przykład chrześcijańskiej postawy wobec zbrodni nazizmu. w pracy zbiorowej pod red. Mariana Grzędy Antyfaszystowska działalność Kościoła katolickiego i ewangelickiego na Pomorzu Zachodnim. : Pastor Dietrich Bonhoeffer i ksiądz Albert Willimsky. Wydawnictwo Naukowe Uniwersytetu Szczecińskiego, Szczecin 2003. 
 Helmut Moll, Ursula Pruß, Pfarrer Albert Willimsky in monography: Zeugen für Christus. Das deutsche Martyrologium des 20. Jahrhunderts site 94-97. Verlag Ferdinand Schöningh, Paderborn 1999. 
 Heinz Kühn,  Blutzeugen des Bistums Berlin. Klausener, Lichtenberg, Lampert, Lorenz, Simoleit, Mandrella, Hirsch, Wachsmann, Metzger, Schäfer, Willimsky, Lenzel, Froehlich. Morus-Verlag, Berlin 1952

External links 
 Priest Albert Willimsky’s biography (Polish)
 Priest Albert Willimsky’s biography (German)
 Website of Archidiocese of Berlin: Reminiscence of priest Albert Willimsky as a victim of nazism (German)

1890 births
1940 deaths
Roman Catholics in the German Resistance
German Army personnel of World War I
German civilians killed in World War II
Resistance members who died in Nazi concentration camps
People who died in Sachsenhausen concentration camp
Martyred Roman Catholic priests
20th-century venerated Christians
People from the Province of Silesia
Clergy from Szczecin
People from Bytom
20th-century German Roman Catholic priests
People from Głogówek